Tiszatelek is a village in Szabolcs-Szatmár-Bereg county, in the Northern Great Plain region of eastern Hungary. In the name of the settlement, the word "telek" is a historical name, while the word "Tisza" refers to the geographical location.

Geography

History
The area around Tiszatelek was already inhabited in the Bronze Age, according to archaeological finds excavated in its boundaries. The former inhabitants of the late Bronze Age Gáva culture populated the whole area. They built their dwellings here on a ridge rising from a marsh in the Rétköz, which not only protected the former inhabitants from external enemies but also kept their livestock from straggling.

The present village of Tiszatelek was founded in 1954 as a one-road settlement on a sandbank of the Rétköz, free from flooding.

References

Tiszatelek